The coronation of Charles III and his wife, Camilla, as king and queen of the United Kingdom and the other Commonwealth realms is scheduled to take place on Saturday, 6 May 2023, at Westminster Abbey. Charles acceded to the throne on 8 September 2022, upon the death of his mother, Elizabeth II.

Compared with previous coronations, the ceremony will undergo some alterations to represent multiple faiths, cultures, and communities across the UK, and will be shorter than Elizabeth II's coronation in 1953. The ceremony will begin with the anointing of Charles, symbolising his spiritual entry into kingship, and then his crowning and enthronement, representing his assumption of temporal powers and responsibilities. Camilla will be crowned in a shorter and simpler ceremony. The royal family will travel to Buckingham Palace in a state procession and appear on the balcony to celebrate the occasion.

The coronation will mark not only a sacred anointing and formal crowning, but also include public celebrations. On 7 May, the Coronation Big Lunch will take place, providing the public with the opportunity to mark the occasion with street parties. The Coronation Concert will be held on the same day at Windsor Castle with representatives of the King and the Queen Consort's charities as well as members of the general public in attendance. On 8 May, the Big Help Out initiative will take place to encourage community service and volunteering. Both the coronation at Westminster Abbey and the concert at Windsor Castle will be broadcast on television.

This will be the first coronation of a British monarch to occur in the 21st century, and the 40th to be held at Westminster Abbey since 1066.

Preparation

Background

Charles III became king immediately upon the death of his mother, Elizabeth II, at 15:10 BST on Thursday 8 September 2022. He was proclaimed king by the Accession Council of the United Kingdom on Saturday 10 September, which was followed by proclamations in other Commonwealth realms. Due to Elizabeth's advanced age, Charles's coronation has been planned for years, under the code name Operation Golden Orb. During Elizabeth's reign, planning meetings for Operation Golden Orb were held at least once a year, attended by representatives of the government, the Church of England and Clarence House staff.

Planning
The duke of Norfolk, Edward Fitzalan-Howard, is in charge of organising the coronation as hereditary earl marshal. A committee of privy counsellors will arrange the event.

In October 2022, the date of Charles and Camilla's coronation was announced: Saturday 6 May 2023 at Westminster Abbey. Buckingham Palace set the date to ensure sufficient time to mourn the death of Queen Elizabeth II before holding a joyous ceremony. In November 2022, the government proclaimed that an extra bank holiday would occur on 8 May, two days after the coronation. On 20 January 2023, Buckingham Palace announced plans for the coronation weekend between 6 and 8 May.

As a state occasion, the coronation is paid for by the British government. The government thus also decides the guest list, which will include members of the British royal family, the British prime minister, representatives of the houses of Parliament, representatives of the governments of the Commonwealth Realms and foreign royalty and heads of state. Safety regulations at Westminster Abbey will restrict the number of guests to around 2,000. After the ceremony, Charles and Camilla are expected to appear on the Buckingham Palace balcony.

For the first time, a Coronation Claims Office within the Cabinet Office has been established instead of the traditional Court of Claims to handle claims to perform a historic or ceremonial role at the coronation.

Emblem 

The Coronation Emblem was designed by Sir Jony Ive with his creative collective LoveFrom and depicts the flora of the four nations of the United Kingdom in the shape of St Edward's Crown. The flora shown in the emblem are the rose for England, the thistle for Scotland, the daffodil for Wales and the shamrock for Northern Ireland. The primary emblem is in blue and red, the colours of the Union Jack. Secondary emblems were also made available in red, blue, black and white. All versions were also made available in Welsh. The Palace also announced that the rules governing the commercial use of Royal Photographs and Official Insignia would be temporarily relaxed with the King and the Queen Consort's approval in this case to allow souvenir manufacturing.

Speculation 
It has been reported that unlike previous coronations, only King Charles's son and heir apparent, Prince William, will pay his personal homage and allegiance to the monarch, while other royal peers will not be asked to do the same. Another press report in January suggested that the King will wear naval uniform at the coronation instead of the traditional breeches and stockings.

It has also been speculated that in a break with tradition, foreign monarchs may be attending the ceremony. Traditionally, foreign monarchs have not attended British coronations but in their place, other members of the royal houses or their representatives attended.

Coronation

Procession
On the day of the coronation, the King and the Queen Consort will travel to Westminster Abbey in the Gold State Coach as part of a procession known as "The King's Procession". Charles, Camilla, and the royal family will return to Buckingham Palace in a larger ceremonial procession, known as "The Coronation Procession", before appearing on the balcony of Buckingham Palace.

It is expected that the uncomfortable Gold State Coach will only be used in the King's Procession; the king and queen will reportedly use a new state coach for the Coronation Procession, which has been built in New South Wales by a team of craftsmen led by W. J. Frecklington and will be flown to London as a gift.

Regalia 

St Edward's Crown, which was removed in December 2022 from the Tower of London for resizing, is to be used to crown the King. A crown referred to as St Edward's Crown (the crown of England) is first recorded as having been used for the coronation of Henry III of England in 1220, and it appears to be the same crown worn by Saint Edward the Confessor. The King will also wear the Imperial State Crown during the ceremony.

In February 2023, Buckingham Palace announced that Queen Mary's Crown had been removed from display at the Tower of London for modification work, to be used to crown Queen Camilla. The crown will be reset with the Cullinan III, IV and V diamonds and four of its detachable arches will be removed. It will be the first time a queen is crowned using another consort's crown since 1727, when Caroline of Ansbach used the Crown of Mary of Modena. The decision not to use the Crown of Queen Elizabeth The Queen Mother avoids a diplomatic dispute with India, which has claimed ownership of the Koh-i-Noor diamond.

The 13th-century Coronation Chair has undergone a programme of restoration and conservation in preparation for the ceremony.

Service

The service will be conducted by the archbishop of Canterbury. A coronation oath is required by statute; the anointing, the delivery of the regalia and the enthronement are also expected to take place. The holy anointing oil was based on the same formula as had been used in the coronation of his mother and was consecrated by Patriarch Theophilos III of Jerusalem at the Church of the Holy Sepulchre on 6 March 2023 under the supervision of Hosam Naoum, the Anglican Archbishop of Jerusalem. Charles will sit in King Edward's Chair, the name of which refers to either Edward the Confessor or Edward I of England, who had it built in 1300 to house the Stone of Scone that the English took from the Scots in 1296. Historic Environment Scotland announced in September 2022 that the Stone of Scone would be moved from the Crown Room of Edinburgh Castle to London for Charles's coronation at Westminster Abbey and returned to the Castle after the ceremony.

Charles's wife, Camilla, will be crowned alongside him as queen consort. When Charles married her in 2005, it was announced by Clarence House that it was not intended that Camilla would assume the title of queen upon his accession. Charles, however, had long wished for her to be so titled and crowned alongside him and, in February 2022, with Camilla's popularity rising, Elizabeth II declared her "sincere wish" that Camilla be known as queen consort upon Charles's accession. This will be the first coronation of a consort since that of his grandmother Queen Elizabeth (later known as the Queen Mother) in 1937.

Music
The King personally oversaw the development of the music programme and commissioned twelve new pieces for the service. Andrew Nethsingha, the organist and master of the choristers at the abbey, was appointed as the director of music for the coronation.

Andrew Lloyd Webber composed a new Coronation Anthem based on Psalm 98, and Patrick Doyle created a Coronation March. Other composers who have written new music for the service include Iain Farrington, Sarah Class, Nigel Hess, Paul Mealor, Tarik O'Regan, Roxanna Panufnik, Shirley J. Thompson, Judith Weir, Roderick Williams, and Debbie Wiseman. Soloists will include Sir Bryn Terfel, Pretty Yende, and Roderick Williams. Music by Sir Karl Jenkins will be part of the programme, while tradition requires that the works of William Byrd, George Frideric Handel, Sir Edward Elgar, Sir Henry Walford Davies, Sir William Walton, Sir Hubert Parry, and Ralph Vaughan Williams be included as well. A liturgical section of the ceremony will be performed in Welsh. Greek Orthodox music will also be included in the service in tribute to the King's father, Prince Philip, Duke of Edinburgh.

The choir for the coronation will be a combination of the choirs of Westminster Abbey, the Chapel Royal, Methodist College Belfast, and Truro Cathedral. The Ascension Choir, a gospel choir, will also perform during the service. The orchestra players will be drawn from Charles's patronages, including the Royal Philharmonic Orchestra. The conductor for the orchestra will be Sir Antonio Pappano, while Sir John Eliot Gardiner will conduct a programme of choral music consisting of the Monteverdi Choir and English Baroque Soloists before the service. The State Trumpeters of the Household Cavalry and the Fanfare Trumpeters of the Royal Air Force will play the fanfares.

Public celebrations

United Kingdom
On 7 May, the "Coronation Big Lunch", organised by the Big Lunch team at the Eden Project, will take place with people signing up to host Big Lunches and street parties across the United Kingdom. Those wishing to throw a street party can apply through their local council to host an event. The "Coronation Concert" will be held on the same day at Windsor Castle's East Lawn. In addition to performances by singers, musicians, and stage and screen actors, the show will also feature "The Coronation Choir" composed of community choirs and amateur singers such as Refugee choirs, NHS choirs, LGBTQ+ singing groups, and deaf signing choirs. The BBC will produce, stage, and broadcast the event, and hold a national ballot between 10–28 February to distribute 5,000 pairs of free tickets for the public based on the geographical spread of the UK population. Volunteers from the King and the Queen Consort's charities will also be among the audience. The Coronation Concert will also feature performances from artists including Lionel Richie, Kylie and Danii Minogue, Olly Murs, and Take That. A number of musical performers — including Elton John, Adele, Harry Styles, Robbie Williams, and The Spice Girls — turned down the palace's invitation to perform, citing scheduling conflicts.

On 8 May, the Big Help Out initiative will take place to encourage volunteering and community service. It is organised by the Together Coalition in partnership with The Scouts, the Royal Voluntary Service and faith groups from across the United Kingdom. The Royal Voluntary Service, of which Camilla is president, launched the Coronation Champions Awards which will recognise a diverse group of volunteers nominated by members of the public. The pubs will also remain open for an extra two hours until 1 am on the coronation weekend.

Canada

A ceremony will take place in Ottawa on 6 May to celebrate Charles III's coronation as King of Canada. The event will include speeches, artistic performances, and special unveilings. On 6 and 7 May, Canadians will be invited to Rideau Hall, the monarch's official Canadian residence, to learn about his ties to Canada. Lieutenant-governors and territorial commissioners will also host celebrations and initiatives throughout May to mark the coronation. On 6 and 7 May, buildings and landmarks across the country will be lit up in emerald green to mark the coronation.

Coverage
The BBC announced that it would suspend the licence fee for the coronation weekend. As a result, venues will be able to screen the coronation on 6 May and the coronation concert on 7 May without needing to buy a TV licence.

Reactions
The anti-monarchist organisation Republic has announced plans to protest in the lead up to the ceremony.

It was reported in October 2022 that "hundreds" of people had signed an online petition demanding that the Stone of Scone should not be removed from Scotland for the coronation. Alex Salmond, the leader of the Alba Party and former first minister of Scotland, suggested in March 2023 that the Scottish Government ought to prevent the stone from being taken to London, despite Historic Environment Scotland having already announced the move.

Notes

See also 
 List of British coronations
 List of people involved in coronations of the British monarch

References

Bibliography

External links
 
 The Coronation of The King and The Queen Consort at the Royal Family website
 Canadian celebrations of His Majesty King Charles III’s Coronation at the website of the Government of Canada

Coronation of Charles III and Camilla
2023 in the United Kingdom
2023 in London
2023 in British television
2023 in international relations
Charles III
Camilla, Queen Consort
Coronations of British monarchs
May 2023 events in the United Kingdom
Scheduled events
Westminster Abbey
2020s in the City of Westminster